Sudinabad (also Romanized as Sūdīnābād; also known as Sebdīnābād) is a village in Margavar Rural District, Silvaneh District, Urmia County, West Azerbaijan Province, Iran. At the 2006 census, its population was 42, in 10 families.

References 

Populated places in Urmia County